State of Mind, released in 1997, is an album by Netherlands power metal band Elegy.

Track listing
"Equinox (Instrumental)" (Henk Van De Laars) - 1:39
"Visual Vortex" (Dirk Bruinenberg, Van De Laars, Ian Parry) - 4:45
"Trust" (Van De Laars, Parry) - 4:01
"Beyond" (Parry) - 5:05
"Shadow Dancer" (Bruinenberg, Van De Laars, Parry) -  4:13
"Aladdin's Cave" (Parry) - 5:39
"State of Mind" (Bruinenberg, Van De Laars, Parry) - 3:33
"Destiny Calling" (Parry) - 6:32
"Resurrection (Instrumental)" (Van De Laars) - 1:03
"Loser's Game" (Van De Laars, Parry) - 3:57
"Suppression" (Parry) - 5:09

Bonus Tracks (2009 re-release)
"Trust" (demo)
"Shadow dancer" (demo)
"Suppression" (demo)
"Visual Vortex" (video)

Japan Bonus Track
"Sweet Revenge"

Line-up

Band Members
Ian Parry - vocals, keyboards
Henk Van De Laars - guitars, keyboards
Dirk Bruinenberg - drums
Martin Helmantel - bass

Guest Artists
Bart Brower - piano
Melly Oudejans - violin

External links
 Ian Parry's Homepage
 Encyclopedia Metallum entry

1997 albums
Elegy (band) albums
Noise Records albums